In computing, bit twiddler may refer to:
 A piece of source code that does bit twiddling, which may mean:
 Doing bit manipulation;
 Interacting with computer hardware, especially when using a bit-banging technique;
 Reading or writing binary file formats; or
 Being unnecessarily complex, perhaps due to premature optimization
 A programmer who writes bit twiddlers, as described above
 A hacker, an enthusiast or a programmer with profound understanding of the fundamentals of computer operation
 A hex editor, a software application that allows the manipulation of binary computer files